Sigma Pi Phi, also known as The Boulé, founded in 1904, is the oldest fraternity for African Americans among those named with Greek letters. The fraternity does not have collegiate chapters and is designed for professionals at mid-career or older. Sigma Pi Phi was founded in Philadelphia, Pennsylvania. 

The fraternity quickly established chapters (referred to as "member boulés") in Chicago, Illinois and then Baltimore, Maryland. 
The founders included two doctors, a dentist and a pharmacist.  When Sigma Pi Phi was founded, black professionals were not offered participation in the professional and cultural associations organized by the white community. Sigma Pi Phi has over 5,000 members and 139 chapters throughout the United States, The United Kingdom, The Bahamas, Colombia and Brazil.

Founders

 Henry M. Minton, PhG
 Eugene T. Hinson, MD
 Robert J. Abele, MD
 Algernon B. Jackson, MD
 Edwin C.J.T. Howard, MD
 Richard J. Warrick Jr., DDS

Membership 
Membership in Sigma Pi Phi is highly exclusive, numbering only about 5,000.  The organization is known as "the Boulé," which means, in Ancient Greek "the Council".  Founded as an organization for professionals, Sigma Pi Phi never established collegiate chapters, and eliminated undergraduate membership during its infant stages. However, Sigma Pi Phi has historically had a congenial relationship with intercollegiate Black Greek-letter organizations, as many members of Sigma Pi Phi are members of both. Sigma Pi Phi founder Henry McKee Minton and Martin Luther King Jr. were both members of Alpha Phi Alpha, while Arthur Ashe was a member of Kappa Alpha Psi. Vernon Jordan and L. Douglas Wilder are members of Omega Psi Phi.  James Weldon Johnson was a member of Phi Beta Sigma, as was civil rights leader and member of Congress John Lewis (D-GA). University of Massachusetts-Boston Chancellor, Dr. J. Keith Motley, and Hibernia Southcoast Capital CEO (Retired), Joseph Williams are members of Iota Phi Theta. Members of Sigma Pi Phi have provided leadership and service during the Great Depression, World War I, World War II, the Great Recession, and addressed social issues such as urban housing, and other economic, cultural, and political issues affecting people of African descent.

Notable members
Members of Sigma Pi Phi include: W. E. B. Du Bois, civil rights leader and one of the founders of the NAACP; Rev. Martin Luther King Jr., civil rights leader; Robert J. Abele, Sigma Pi Phi founder and brother of Julian Abele, who served as the lead architect of Duke University; former NAACP President Kweisi Mfume; Ralph Bunche, a United Nations Ambassador and first African-American winner of the Nobel Peace Prize; Andrew Young, civil rights leader and a mayor of Atlanta; Maynard Jackson, a mayor of Atlanta; Douglas Wilder, a Governor of Virginia; Kenneth Chenault, a CEO of American Express; Bobby Scott; C. O. Simpkins Sr.; Ken Blackwell; Eric Holder, a United States Attorney General; Ron Brown; Vernon Jordan; Arthur Ashe; Mel Watt; John Baxter Taylor Jr., the first African-American to win an Olympic Gold Medal; and Calvin Ball, first African-American County Executive. Numerous other American leaders are among the men who have adopted the fraternity’s purpose of "creating a forum wherein they could pursue social and intellectual activities in the company of peers." 
Sigma Pi Phi is  open to members of all races, as can be demonstrated by its well-known Jewish member Jack Greenberg, who succeeded Thurgood Marshall as the leader of the NAACP Legal Defense and Educational Fund, Inc.

In media
Lawrence Otis Graham reports on the organization and his membership in it  in the 1999 book Our Kind of People:  Inside America's Black Upper Class.

See also
American Black Upper Class

Notes

References

External links
 Official Site
 Journal Articles
 Site for Beta Lambda chapter in Hampton Roads, Virginia
 Site for Gamma Iota chapter in Rochester, NY
 Southeast Region Site
 The Gentlemen's Club Beautillion Service Project
 Grand Boulé of Sigma Pi Phi Centennial Celebration
 Finding the Good and Praising It—Sigma Pi Phi: The Boule
 1904–2004: The Boule at 100: Sigma Pi Phi Fraternity holds centennial celebration
Stuart A. Rose Manuscript, Archives, and Rare Book Library, Emory University: Sigma Pi Phi records, 1926-2019

African-American upper class
Student organizations established in 1904
Clubs and societies in the United States
African-American fraternities and sororities
1904 establishments in Pennsylvania
Black elite